Hilton Cabral de Almeida (born 8 July 1942) is a Brazilian former footballer.

References

1942 births
Living people
Association football defenders
Brazilian footballers
CR Flamengo footballers
Pan American Games medalists in football
Pan American Games silver medalists for Brazil
Footballers at the 1959 Pan American Games
Medalists at the 1959 Pan American Games